"Burning Flame" is the debut single by English new wave band Vitamin Z, released in 1984. It is from their debut album, Rites of Passage. The song was produced by former Adam and the Ants drummer Chris Hughes, and Ross Cullum. It charted in both the UK and U.S., peaking at numbers 80 and 73, respectively. It also reached No. 27 on the Billboard Dance Club Songs chart. It is the band's best known and most successful song.

Charts

References

1984 songs
1984 debut singles
British new wave songs
Song recordings produced by Chris Hughes (record producer)
Song recordings produced by Ross Cullum
Mercury Records singles
Geffen Records singles